The Columbia County Courthouse in Appling, Georgia is a building from 1812 with extensive additions made to the structure in 1856. It was listed on the National Register of Historic Places in 1980.

It is a two-story building with Italianate brackets at its eaves.  John Trowbridge is identified as its architect/builder.

As of 1980, the courthouse's condition was identified as "good", it was in use by the county, and there had been plans by the county government to restore the building.

References

Courthouses on the National Register of Historic Places in Georgia (U.S. state)
Italianate architecture in Georgia (U.S. state)
Government buildings completed in 1812
Buildings and structures in Columbia County, Georgia
Former county courthouses in Georgia (U.S. state)
National Register of Historic Places in Columbia County, Georgia
1812 establishments in Georgia (U.S. state)